Carolina Tabares Guerrero  (born 18 June 1986) is a Colombian long-distance runner. She represented her country in the 5000 metres at the 2013 World Championships without advancing to the final.

International competitions

Personal bests
Outdoor
1500 metres – 4:28.66 (Ponce 2009)
3000 metres – 9:41.49 (Carolina 2008)
5000 metres – 15:35.30 (Trujillo 2013)
10,000 metres – 32:19.59 (Palo Alto 2019) NR
10 kilometres – 33:45 (Girardot 2017)
15 kilometres – 54:15 (Bogotá 2018)
Half marathon – 1:16:21 (Coamo 2010)

References

1986 births
Living people
Colombian female long-distance runners
Athletes (track and field) at the 2015 Pan American Games
Athletes (track and field) at the 2019 Pan American Games
Pan American Games competitors for Colombia
World Athletics Championships athletes for Colombia
South American Championships in Athletics winners
Competitors at the 2018 Central American and Caribbean Games
21st-century Colombian women